Southern California Railway was formed on November 7, 1889. it was formed by consolidation of 
California Southern Railroad Company, the California Central Railway Company, and the Redondo Beach Railway Company.

A second consolidation and reforming on the Southern California Railway was on June 27, 1892 this was done by consolidation of former Southern California Railway Company (above) with Santa Fe And Santa Monica Railway and the San Bernardino & Eastern Railway.
On May 1, 1899 the Southern California Railway as took control of the Elsinore, Pomona And Los Angeles Railway.

All of lines of Southern California Railway Company line (list above) were deeded to the Atchison, Topeka and Santa Fe Railway Company on January 17, 1906.

San Bernardino and Eastern Railway 
San Bernardino and Eastern Railway was chartered on August 11, 1890 to build a rail line from City of San Bernardino, California via Highland, California to connect with line of Southern California Railway Company at or near its terminus in San Bernardino County, connecting at Mentone, California with rail tracks built to that point in 1887 under charter of San Bernardino Valley Railway Company.

Santa Fe and Santa Monica Railway  
Santa Fe And Santa Monica Railway Company was chartered to build from a point at or near "Mesmer Station" on line of Southern California Railway Company between Inglewood, California and Port Ballona (what is now Playa del Rey, Los Angeles), to Santa Monica, California. This franchise and its track were sold on March 21, 1902, to Los Angeles Pacific Railroad Company, including the rail line from Inglewood to near Mesmer Station built under charter of Los Angeles and Santa Monica Railroad Company.

Elsinore, Pomona and Los Angeles Railway

Elsinore, Pomona And Los Angeles Railway Company was charted on December 6, 1895 to build from Lake Elsinore, California in Riverside County, in a north-westerly direction by way of Pomona to Azusa, in Los Angeles County, with a branch from Pomona to Lordsburg College. Construction was only completed from Elsinore Junction on line of Southern California Railway to Alberhill a total of 7.8 miles. This rail line was deeded to Southern California Railway Company on May 1, 1899.

See also

List of California railroads
History of rail transportation in California
Cajon Pass
Southern Transcon
Union Station (Los Angeles)
Pacific Electric's Red Cars that connected with the rail lines.
Santa Fe 3751
David B. Jones Special

References 

HISTORICAL REVIEW OF THE ATCHISON, TOPEKA AND SANTA FE RAILWAY COMPANY.
Annual meetings, and directors and officers, Volumes 7-12 By Atchison, Topeka, and Santa Fe Railway Company
Annual Report on the Statistics of Railways in the United States.
STATISTICS OF RAILWAYS IN THE UNITED STATES. INTERSTATE COMMERCE COMMISSION. NINTH ANNUAL REPORT ON THE STATISTICS OF RAILWAYS IN THE UNITED STATES 
Los Angeles Herald, Volume 38, Number 52, 2 June 1892 
abandonedrails.com Inglewood Branch, Mesmer

Predecessors of the Atchison, Topeka and Santa Fe Railway
Defunct California railroads
Railway companies established in 1889
Railway companies disestablished in 1906
History of Southern California